Claude Cassius Ritchey (October 5, 1873 – November 8, 1951) was a Major League Baseball player. Nicknamed "Little All Right", he played second base, shortstop, and outfield for the Cincinnati Reds, Pittsburgh Pirates, Boston Doves, and Louisville Colonels from 1897 to 1909.

In the 1903 World Series, his only postseason appearance, he hit only .148 (4-for-27) but handled 49 total chances (20 putouts, 29 assists) without an error and was involved in 5 double plays.

In 1672 games over 13 seasons, Ritchey posted a .273 batting average (1619-for-5923) with 709 runs, 216 doubles, 68 triples, 18 home runs, 675 RBI, 155 stolen bases, and 607 base on balls. He finished his career with a .952 fielding percentage.

See also

List of Major League Baseball career stolen bases leaders

References

External links

1873 births
1951 deaths
People from Emlenton, Pennsylvania
Baseball players from Pennsylvania
Major League Baseball second basemen
Cincinnati Reds players
Louisville Colonels players
Pittsburgh Pirates players
Boston Doves players
Akron Akrons players
Buffalo Bisons (minor league) players
Providence Grays (minor league) players
19th-century baseball players
Pittsburgh Filipinos players